Cerro Ascotan (also known as ) is a volcano on the border between Chile and Bolivia. The volcano's summit, about one third thereof, was removed by a large explosion, with debris thrown at large distances. Volcanic activity probably occurred during the Pleistocene. The volcano is neighbor to Cerro Araral.

References

External links
 

Volcanoes of Chile
Mountains of Chile
Volcanoes of Bolivia
Mountains of Bolivia
Stratovolcanoes of Bolivia
Stratovolcanoes of Chile
Pleistocene stratovolcanoes